The Davis House is a historic house at 212 Fulton Street in Clarksville, Arkansas.  It is a -story wood-frame American Foursquare structure, with a hip roof, weatherboard siding, and a foundation of rusticated concrete blocks.  The roof has flared eaves with exposed rafter ends, and a front-facing dormer with a Flemish-style gable.  The porch extends across the front and curves around to the side, supported by Tuscan columns.  The house was built about 1905 to a design by noted Arkansas architect Charles L. Thompson.

The house was listed on the National Register of Historic Places in 1982.

See also
National Register of Historic Places listings in Johnson County, Arkansas

References

Houses on the National Register of Historic Places in Arkansas
Colonial Revival architecture in Arkansas
Houses completed in 1905
Houses in Johnson County, Arkansas
National Register of Historic Places in Johnson County, Arkansas
1905 establishments in Arkansas